Tapinoma demissum is a species of ant in the genus Tapinoma. Described by Bolton in 1995, the species is endemic to Tanzania and Zimbabwe.

References

Tapinoma
Hymenoptera of Africa
Insects described in 1995